The 2002–03 season was Kilmarnock's fourth consecutive season in the Scottish Premier League, having competed in it since its inauguration in 1998–99. Kilmarnock also competed in the Scottish Cup and the League Cup.

Summary

Season
In their first full season under Jim Jefferies, Kilmarnock finished fourth in the Scottish Premier League with 57 points. They reached the second round of the League Cup, losing to Airdrie United, and the third round of the Scottish Cup, losing to Motherwell.

Results and fixtures

Kilmarnock's score comes first

Scottish Premier League

Scottish League Cup

Scottish Cup

Player statistics

|}

Final league table

Division summary

Transfers

Players in

Players out

References

External links
 Kilmarnock 2002–03 at Soccerbase.com (select relevant season from dropdown list)

Kilmarnock F.C. seasons
Kilmarnock